The 1980 World's Strongest Man was the fourth edition of World's Strongest Man and was won by Bill Kazmaier from the United States. It was his first title after finishing third the previous year. Lars Hedlund from Sweden finished second after finishing second the previous year, and Geoff Capes from the United Kingdom finished third.

Defending champion Don Reinhoudt was forced to retire from the competition due to injury in his final World's Strongest Man. 

The contest was held in the United States for the fourth consecutive year, at the Vernon Valley/Great Gorge Resort in Vernon, New Jersey.

Events
There were a total of 10 different events used in the competition:
 Overhead Log lift (wooden log) – Winner Bill Kazmaier & Lars Hedlund 346lbs
 Weight toss (56lbs weight over bar throw) – Winner Bishop Dolegiewicz 17 feet
 Truck pull (16200lbs truck pull over 100foot course in heats) – Winner Cleve Dean
 Engine race (800lbs over 150feet uphill course) – Winner Bill Kazmaier in 14:40sec
 Steel bar bend – Winner Bill Kazmaier (only one that finished bending the two ends 5inch together)
 Fridge Carry (420lbs fridge over 100foot uphill course) – Winner Geoff Capes in 10:72sec
 Girl Lift (Squat on a smith machine with Playboy Girls on top) – Winner Bill Kazmaier 934lbs
 Silver Dollar Deadlift (18" off the floor with straps allowed) Winner Bill Kazmaier 956lbs
 Battery hold – Winner Jerry Hannan
 tug of war (between the four best competitors) – Winner Bill Kazmaier

Final results
The American Bill Kazmaier dominated the competition by winning 6 events, getting two second places, one third and one fourth place:
He tied for first in the Log lift, together with Lars Hedlund. He won the engine race, the steel bar bend, the Girl Squat lift, the Silver Dollar Deadlift and the final tug of war. He came in second in the weight toss and the fridge Carry. He took third in the battery hold and got fourth in the truck pull.

References

External links
 Official site

World's Strongest
World's Strongest Man
1980 in sports in New Jersey
1980 in American sports